The Viterbese or  is a breed of donkey from Lazio in central Italy. It is particularly associated with the town and province of Viterbo from which it takes its name, and with the Monti della Tolfa and the town of Allumiere in the province of Rome. In 2007 it was reported by the FAO as extinct. In 2012 it was added to the list of autochthonous donkey breeds of limited distribution recognised by the Ministero delle Politiche Agricole Alimentari e Forestali, the Italian ministry of agriculture and forestry. A total population of 153 head was reported in the same year.

References

Donkey breeds originating in Italy
Donkey breeds
Viterbo